The St. John's Episcopal Church in Abilene, Kansas, is a historic church at 519 N. Buckeye Avenue.  It was built in about 1939 and added to the National Register of Historic Places in 2001.

It is "a modest yet nicely articulated example of the Gothic Revival style."  It is cruciform in plan, built in stone, and incorporates its predecessor church building, a simple wood Gothic Revival structure from the 1880s.

References

External links
Official website

Buildings and structures in Dickinson County, Kansas
Episcopal church buildings in Kansas
Gothic Revival church buildings in Kansas
Churches on the National Register of Historic Places in Kansas
Churches completed in 1939
National Register of Historic Places in Dickinson County, Kansas